Silvia Sicouri (born 27 September 1987) is an Italian competitive sailor.

She competed at the 2016 Summer Olympics in Rio de Janeiro, in the mixed Nacra 17.

References

1987 births
Living people
Italian female sailors (sport)
Olympic sailors of Italy
Sailors at the 2016 Summer Olympics – Nacra 17
Sailors of Fiamme Azzurre
21st-century Italian women